Bruce W. Holsinger is an American author, novelist, and an academic and literary scholar. Currently, he is professor of English at the University of Virginia.

Academic career

He is considered an expert on the use of parchment in medieval English manuscript production, and organized, with bioarchaeologists from the University of York, the research project into uterine vellum which established the precise composition for the material used in for the creation of the earliest bible manuscripts.

Novelist
The New York Times described him as "gamekeeper turned poacher", due to the fact that Holsinger, a professor at the University of Virginia, specializing in medieval English literature, turned to writing fiction based around his academic interests. His first novel was A Burnable Book in 2014. This was set in fourteenth-century England during the reign of King Richard II, and has Holsinger's protagonist John Gower—at the instigation of Geoffrey Chaucer—hunt down a supposedly revolutionary book, in which a series of poems predict the deaths of the kings of England. One of the most prominent characters is one Edgar Rykener—who is in-universe also called Eleanor—a man who dresses as a woman and has sex for money. This inclusion, says Holsinger, is directly based on the real-life case of John Rykener, which also occurred in 1394, the year Holsinger sets the events of his book.

In February 2018 Holsinger was appointed editor of the University of Virginia's peer reviewed journal, New Literary History; he is the third member of staff to take the position since the journal's foundation in 1969. He has written for the New York Review of Books, The Washington Post and op-eds for The New York Times.

Books

Fiction
 The Displacements (2022)
 The Gifted School (2019)
 The Invention of Fire (2015)
 A Burnable Book (2014)

Non-Fiction
 Neomedievalism, Neoconservatism, and the War on Terror (Chicago, 2007)
 The Premodern Condition: Medievalism and the Making of Theory (Chicago, 2005)
 Music, Body, and Desire in Medieval Culture (Stanford, 2001)

Notes

References

Sources 
 
 

Year of birth missing (living people)
Living people
University of Virginia staff
American historical fiction writers